Gera I is an electoral constituency (German: Wahlkreis) represented in the Landtag of Thuringia. It elects one member via first-past-the-post voting. Under the current constituency numbering system, it is designated as constituency 41. It covers the northern part of Gera.

Gera I was created in 1990 for the first state election. Originally named Gera-Nord, it was renamed in 1994. Since 2019, it has been represented by Daniel Reinhardt of The Left.

Geography
As of the 2019 state election, Gera I covers the northern part of Gera, specifically the city districts (Ortsteile) of Aga, Cretzschwitz, Ernsee, Frankenthal, Hain, Hermsdorf, Milbitz, Roben, Röpsen, Rubitz, Scheubengrobsdorf, Söllmnitz, Thieschitz, Trebnitz, and Windischenbernsdorf.

Members
The constituency was held by the Christian Democratic Union (CDU) from its creation in 1990 until 2004, during which time it was represented by Eckehard Kölbel. In 2004 it was won by Margit Jung of the Party of Democratic Socialism (PDS). She was re-elected as candidate for The Left in 2009 and 2014. Since 2019, it has been represented by Daniel Reinhardt.

Election results

2019 election

2014 election

2009 election

2004 election

1999 election

1994 election

1990 election

Notes

References

Electoral districts in Thuringia
1994 establishments in Germany
Gera
Constituencies established in 1994